Kotzebue or Qikiqtaġruk is a city in the Northwest Arctic Borough in the U.S. state of Alaska.  It is the borough's seat, by far its largest community and the economic and transportation hub of the subregion of Alaska encompassing the borough.  The population of the city was 3,102 as of the 2020 census, down from 3,201 in 2010. The city has received an All-America City award.

History

Etymology and prehistory
Owing to its location and relative size, Kotzebue served as a trading and gathering center for the various communities in the region. The Noatak, Selawik and Kobuk Rivers drain into the Kotzebue Sound near Kotzebue to form a center for transportation to points inland. In addition to people from interior villages, inhabitants of far-eastern Asia, now the Russian Far East, came to trade at Kotzebue. Furs, seal-oil, hides, rifles, ammunition, and seal skins were some of the items traded. People also gathered for competitions like the current World Eskimo Indian Olympics. With the arrival of the whalers, traders, gold seekers, and missionaries the trading center expanded.

Kotzebue is also known as Qikiqtaġruk, means "small island" or "resembles an island" in the Iñupiaq language. In the words of the late Iñupiaq elder Blanche Qapuk Lincoln of Kotzebue:

Kotzebue gets its name from the Kotzebue Sound, which was named after Otto von Kotzebue, a Baltic German who explored the sound while searching for the Northwest Passage in the service of Russia in 1818.

19th century
A United States post office was established in 1899.

20th and 21st century

In 1958, Kotzebue Air Force Station was completed. The radar site would be operated by on-site personnel until its deactivation in 1983 and the subsequent demolition of most of the station's structures. The radome continues to operate, but is now mostly unattended.

In 1997, three 66-kw wind turbines were installed in Kotzebue, creating the northernmost wind farm in the United States. Today, the wind farm consists of 19 turbines, including two 900 kW EWT turbines. The total installed capacity has reached 3-MW, displacing approximately 250,000 gallons of diesel fuel every year.

On September 2, 2015, U.S. President Barack Obama gave a speech on global warming in Kotzebue, becoming the first sitting president to visit a site north of the Arctic Circle.

Since 2016, the United States Coast Guard has deployed MH-60 Jayhawk helicopters to Kotzebue from the beginning of July to the end of October as part of Operation Arctic Shield.

On December 3rd, 2018, Mike Dunleavy was sworn in as the 12th governor of Alaska in Kotzebue's high school gymnasium after inclement weather thwarted his plan to hold the ceremony in Noorvik.

Geography
Kotzebue lies on a gravel spit at the end of the Baldwin Peninsula in the Kotzebue Sound.

Kotzebue is home to the NANA Regional Corporation, one of thirteen Alaska Native Regional Corporations created under the Alaska Native Claims Settlement Act of 1971 (ANCSA) in settlement of Alaska Native land claims.

Kotzebue is a gateway to Kobuk Valley National Park and other natural attractions of northern Alaska. The Northwest Arctic Heritage Center, operated by the National Park Service, serves as a community meeting space and visitor center to Kobuk Valley National Park, Noatak National Preserve and Cape Krusenstern National Monument. Nearby Selawik National Wildlife Refuge also maintains office space in the town.

Climate
Days with the maximum reaching at or above  can be expected an average of six days per summer. Precipitation is both most frequent and greatest during the summer months with August the wettest month averaging . Snowfall averages about  a season (July through June of the next year).

Notes

Demographics

Kotzebue first appeared on the 1880 U.S. Census under its predecessor unincorporated Inuit village named "Kikiktagamute." It did not appear again until 1910, then as Kotzebue. It formally incorporated in 1958.

As of the census of 2000, there were 3,082 people, 889 households, and 656 families residing in the city. The racial makeup of the city was 71.2% American Indian, 19.5% White, 1.8% Asian, 0.3% Black or African American, 0.1% Pacific Islander, 0.8% from other races, and 6.4% from two or more races. Hispanic or Latino of any race were 1.2% of the population.

There were 889 households, out of which 50.4% had children under the age of 18 living with them, 46.1% were married couples living together, 17.4% had a female householder with no husband present, and 26.1% were non-families. 19.3% of all households were made up of individuals, and 2.0% had someone living alone who was 65 years of age or older. The average household size was 3.40 and the average family size was 3.93.

In the city, the age distribution of the population shows 39.8% under the age of 18, 8.5% from 18 to 24, 30.4% from 25 to 44, 17.2% from 45 to 64, and 4.1% who were 65 years of age or older. The median age was 26 years. For every 100 females, there were 102.0 males. For every 100 females age 18 and over, there were 104.5 males.

The median income for a household in the city was $57,163, and the median income for a family was $58,068. Males had a median income of $42,604 versus $36,453 for females. The per capita income for the city was $18,289. About 9.2% of families and 13.1% of the population were below the poverty line, including 14.9% of those under age 18 and 6.0% of those age 65 or over.

Infrastructure

Transportation
Kotzebue's Ralph Wien Memorial Airport is the one airport in the Northwest Arctic Borough with regularly scheduled large commercial passenger aircraft service to and from Ted Stevens Anchorage International Airport and the Nome Airport.

Health care
Kotzebue is home to the Maniilaq Association, a tribally-operated health and social services organization named after Maniilaq and part of the Alaska Native Tribal Health Consortium. Maniilaq Health Center is the primary health care facility for the residents of the Northwest Arctic Borough. The facility houses an emergency room with local and medevac support for accident/trauma victims, as well as an ambulatory care clinic, dental and eye care clinics, a pharmacy, a specialty clinic, and an inpatient wing with 17 beds for recovering patients.

Health care providers at Maniilaq Health Center provide telemedicine support to Community Health Aides (CHAPs) in the outlying villages of the Northwest Arctic Borough. The CHAPs, who work in village-based clinics, are trained in basic health assessment and can treat common illnesses. For more complicated cases, the CHAPs communicate with Maniilaq Health Center medical staff via phone, video-conference, and digital images.

Media
The Arctic Sounder is a weekly newspaper published by Alaska Media, LLC, which covers Kotzebue and the rest of the Northwest Arctic Borough along with the North Slope Borough (and its hub community of Utqiagvik).

KOTZ, broadcasting at 720 on the AM dial, is the public radio station serving Kotzebue, one of two Class A clear-channel stations in the United States at that frequency (the other being Chicago's WGN).  KOTZ operates an extensive translator network serving the rest of the borough.

Education
Northwest Arctic Borough School District operates two schools in Kotzebue: June Nelson Elementary School (JNES) and Kotzebue Middle High School (KMHS).  they had 394 and 309 students, making them the largest schools in the district.

There is one private school run by the Native Village of Kotzebue called Nikaitchuat Iḷisaġviat. It is an Inupiaq language immersion school for grades PK through one.

University of Alaska Fairbanks (UAF) operates their Chukchi Campus which offers classes, a library and other community services.

Notable people
 John Baker (c. 1962), winner of the 2011 Iditarod Trail Sled Dog Race;  his finishing time that year established a race record, which stood until broken by Dallas Seavey three years later
 Willie Hensley (born 1941), former state Representative, former state Senator, one of key founders of NANA Regional Corporation, instrumental in the passage of the Alaska Native Claims Settlement Act
 Katherine Keith, Author of Epic Solitude, co-owner of Remote Solutions, LLC with John Baker.
 Reggie Joule (born 1952), who represented Kotzebue and surrounding area in the Alaska House of Representatives for eight terms followed by a single term as borough mayor, achieved minor national fame during the 1970s and 1980s for his exploits in the World Eskimo Indian Olympics, including two appearances on The Tonight Show Starring Johnny Carson
 Seth Kantner, novelist
John Lincoln (born 1981), member of the Alaska House of Representatives 
 Segundo Llorente (1906–1989), Spanish-born Jesuit, philosopher, author and politician
 Adam Stennett (born 1972), painter

Toxins
Although, no "toxic releases" come "from within the bounds of this small tundra metropolis, Kotzebue, the methods used by the U.S. Environmental Protection Agency (EPA)'s in their Toxic Releases Inventory (TRI) reports that in 2016, Kotzebue, with only 7,500 inhabitants, "produced" 756 million pounds of toxins. The TRI placed Kotzebue as the most toxic place in the United States. The second most toxic was Bingham Canyon, Utah at 200 million pounds of toxins. However, as National Geographic explains, the source of the toxins is not Kotzebue, but Alaska's Red Dog mine. Since the mine is located in a remote area in Alaska, the toxic release is linked to the nearest "city"— Kotzebue. The EPA says that when a "facility" is "not located in a city, town, village, or similar entity will often list a nearby city." National Geographic says that, "All 756 million pounds of toxic chemicals attributed to "Kotzebue" on the TRI dataset came from one of the world's largest zinc and lead mines, the Red Dog mine, which is located about 80 miles north of Kotzebue." At the county level the Northwest Arctic of Alaska leads the list with 756,000,000 pounds of toxins. The state of Alaska produces three times more toxins than every other American state—834 million pounds.

References

Further reading

Anderson, Douglas D., and Robert A. Henning. The Kotzebue Basin. Alaska geographic, v. 8, no. 3. Anchorage: Alaska Geographic Society, 1981. 
Giddings, J. Louis, and Douglas D. Anderson. Beach Ridge Archeology of Cape Krusenstern Eskimo and Pre-Eskimo Settlements Around Kotzebue Sound, Alaska. Washington, D.C.: National Park Service, U.S. Dept. of the Interior, 1986.
Lucier, Charles V., and James W. VanStone. Traditional Beluga Drives of the Iñupiat of Kotzebue Sound, Alaska. Fieldiana, new ser., no. 25. Chicago: Field Museum of Natural History, 1995.

External links

  of the City of Kotzebue
 

Borough seats in Alaska
Chukchi Sea
Cities in Alaska
Cities in Northwest Arctic Borough, Alaska
Populated coastal places in Alaska on the Arctic Ocean
Populated places of the Arctic United States